The cult of Maria Santissima della Confusione began in the province of Trapani, and eventually spread in the near province of Palermo.

Origin of the name 
Maria Santissima della Confusione, that is venerated by the Friars Minor Capuchin of Salemi, is an oil painting realized in the 18th century by fra Felice da Sambuca; it is represented a Madonna in tears, with the symbols of the Passion of Jesus (the spear, the sponge with vinegar, the nails and the column of Jesus’ flagellation)  around her.

The  title Madonna della Confusione, referred to Mary,  expresses the state of consternation, of confusion, that seizes a person when he is the victim of a strong pain. Maria, a disciple of Jesus until his death,  shows u show a mother remains confused, that is afflicted and at a loss, faced with the painful death of a son.

The  term Confused derives from the Latin cum and fixus, then with-fixed,  hanged with, but also from cum-flictus, con-flicted,  from which the derivation of the term afflicted, that is  confitto,  as a person beaten vigorously, put on the cross with violence, together his Son. Even in this she identifies herself with Jesus, as she merges with Him, cum-fusio, and for this reason she suffers with Him and climbs on the Cross, (juxta crucem lacrimosa, in the  Stabat Mater of  Jacopone da Todi).

Man turns to Her in every moment of confusion, because She is the mediator between God and us, through her Son, and can help us in the difficulties of life.

Devotion 
It has started and spread, above all, in the friaries of Capuchins.

In Salemi the feast has taken place on the last Sunday of August for about three centuries:  they carry the magnificent painting of Madonna della Confusione in procession along the town streets. Even if she is not the patroness of Salemi, she is much venerated by people.
The devotion to this Madonna is also very profound in Marsala, in the convent and in the Church of the Capuchins dedicated to Madonna della Confusione; the image of Our Lady of Sorrows  with her head  bent a little on the right, fingers crossed and eyes narrowed; in front of her, on a small table, there are the nails of crucifixion

In Partanna, in the small Church dedicated to Saint Andrew the Apostle, next to the friary of Capuchins, there was a valuable painting of Madonna della Confusione which was stolen after that 1968 Belice earthquake  had damaged the small Church.  The image was similar to the other icons: Our Lady has the head bent on the left, fingers crossed on her chest and a mantle dropping down.

In Alcamo, in the Church of Saint Anne, there is a painting on canvas dated 1916, made by Leonardo Mirabile from Alcamo, representing Maria Santissima della Confusione.  This picture is a copy of a painting made by Giuseppe Renda, dedicated to  Our Lady of Sorrows, which was kept in the Church of Saint Mary of Jesus, and stolen in 1979.

There are also icons of Madonna della Confusione in the monasteries and ex monasteries of Capuchins of Erice, Mazara del Vallo, Trapani. In the province of Palermo: at Giuliana and at Palermo Boccadifalco, where the cult rose as the patron saint of pregnant women.

See also 
 Salemi
 Alcamo
Erice
Giuliana
Mazara del Vallo
Paceco
Palermo
Partanna
Marsala
Trapani
 Frati Minori Cappuccini

References

Sources 
 Salvatore Agueci: La Devozione alla Madonna della Confusione, con prefazione di Mons. Calogero Peri, vescovo di Caltagirone;  Editrice ASLA, Palermo, 2015
 Carlo Cataldo, Guida storico-artistica dei beni culturali di Alcamo-Calatafimi-Castellammare del Golfo, Alcamo, Sarograf, 1982.

External links 
 http://biscobreak.altervista.org/2015/08/madonna-della-confusione/
 http://www.fraticappuccini.it/new_site/index.php/eventi-di-rilievo/3229-pubblicato-lla-devozione-alla-madonna-della-confusioner.html
 https://web.archive.org/web/20161229094847/http://www.chiesasantannamarsala.it/chiesa-madonna-della-confusione/
 http://www.trapaninostra.it/libri/carlo_cataldo/Splendori_della_memoria/Splendori_della_memoria-04.pdf
 http://www.giornalekleos.it/festa-della-madonna-della-confusione/
 http://matricesalemi.blogspot.it/p/le-chiese-di-salemi.html
 
 http://www.foto-sicilia.it/foto.cfm?idfoto=160922&idcategoria=1&citta=alcamo&idfotografo=3162
 http://www.evensi.it/centenario-quadro-chiesa-santanna-cappuccini/172756313
 https://www.youtube.com/watch?v=yy7l0sXOc6w
 http://ricerca.repubblica.it/repubblica/archivio/repubblica/2010/08/21/la-madonna-della-confusione-che-protegge-il.html

Catholic art
Titles of Mary